Ovsyannikovo is a rural locality (a village) in Golovinskoye Rural Settlement, Sudogodsky District, Vladimir Oblast, Russia. The population was 104 as of 2010. Today, its population is 103.

Geography 
It is located 3 km east from Golovino, 27 km west from Sudogda.

References 

Rural localities in Sudogodsky District